The NWSL Shield is an annual award given to the National Women's Soccer League (NWSL) team with the best regular season record as determined by the NWSL points system. The NWSL Shield has been awarded annually since 2013 and is recognized as a major trophy by the league.

North Carolina Courage and Seattle-based team OL Reign, each with three NWSL Shields since the league's inception in 2013, are tied for the most shields won by any NWSL team as of 2022. OL Reign are the current (2022) winners.

History 
When the NWSL was launched in 2013, the league's format was set up similarly to other contemporary North American leagues. After the regular season, the NWSL Playoffs were held with the top four teams vying for a spot in the postseason championship match. The club with the most regular-season points was awarded the NWSL Shield and earned the top seed in the playoffs.

Point system and tiebreakers 

Since the 2013 inaugural season, the system of awarding points in the NWSL is the same as the international standard: three points for a win, one for a draw, and no points for a loss. In the event of an end-of-season tie in total accumulated points, the following tie-breakers are used among all teams with the same number of points:
 Head-to-head record: The most points earned against all other teams that are tied on points.
 Goal differential: Goals-for minus goals-against during the season.
 Goals for: Total goals scored throughout the season.
 Head-to-head road record: The team with the most points earned on the road against all other teams that are tied on points.
 Road goal differential.
 Road goals for.
 Coin toss.
All tiebreakers involving goal counts (goal differential, goals for) include all regular-season games, not just games against tied teams.

Winners

Records

Shield winners

See also 

 List of sports awards honoring women
 NWSL awards
 NWSL playoffs
 NWSL records and statistics
 List of American and Canadian soccer champions

References

External links
 

Shield